The Jackson Street Historic District located in Winnsboro, Louisiana is a  historic district which was listed on the National Register of Historic Places on October 5, 1982.

Contributing Properties
At the time of its enlistment it included eight contributing buildings, comprinsing three houses and five outbuildings:

Belle Fann (1891), a one-story, five bay, galleried, retardaire Greek Revival building. Apparently no more standing.
Godfrey House (1900), a one-story, five bay, framed, pitched-roof structure with a five bay Eastlake gallery under a separate roof. It is now hosting the Jackson Street Guest House.
Scott Elam House (1906), a one-story, five bay, framed structure with four posts supporting a central Queen Anne Revival front porch gable.
Smokehouse (c.1900) of Belle Fann farm, hip-roofed board and batten structure
Outhouse
Barn (c.1900) is a board and batten structure with a low pitched roof,
Shed (c.1900)
Maid's house (c.1900), a small one room frame cottage.

See also
National Register of Historic Places listings in Franklin Parish, Louisiana

References

National Register of Historic Places in Louisiana
Greek Revival architecture in Louisiana
Queen Anne architecture in Louisiana
Buildings and structures completed in 1891
Franklin Parish, Louisiana
Historic districts on the National Register of Historic Places in Louisiana